Nancy Morin (28 August 1975 – 8 May 2020) was a blind Canadian goalball player who competed in international level events. She participated in five Summer Paralympic Games and won two consecutive gold medals.

References

External links
 
 

1975 births
2020 deaths
Sportspeople from Longueuil
Paralympic goalball players of Canada
Goalball players at the 2000 Summer Paralympics
Goalball players at the 2004 Summer Paralympics
Goalball players at the 2008 Summer Paralympics
Place of death missing
Goalball players at the 2012 Summer Paralympics
Goalball players at the 2016 Summer Paralympics
Medalists at the 2000 Summer Paralympics
Medalists at the 2004 Summer Paralympics
Paralympic medalists in goalball
Paralympic gold medalists for Canada
Medalists at the 2011 Parapan American Games
Medalists at the 2015 Parapan American Games